Erynnis martialis, commonly known as the mottled duskywing, is a species of butterfly in the  family Hesperiidae. It is found in most of the eastern United States and in southern Ontario, and southeastern Manitoba. It is listed as a species of special concern and believed extirpated in the US state of Connecticut.

The wingspan is 25–29 mm. There can be two generations from mid-May to late August.

The larvae feed on wild lilacs including New Jersey tea (Ceanothus americanus) and redroot (Ceanothus herbaceus) in the buckthorn family (Rhamnaceae). Adults feed on nectar from flowers of Bush houstonia,  Gromwell, Verbena stricta and other plants.

References

External links
Mottled Duskywing, Nearctica
Mottled Duskywing, BugGuide
Mottled Duskywing, Butterflies and Moths of North America

Erynnis
Butterflies of North America
Butterflies described in 1869
Taxa named by Samuel Hubbard Scudder